The 1987 FIFA World Youth Championship took place in Chile from 10 to 25 October 1987. The 1987 championship was the 6th edition of the FIFA World Youth Championship and won for the first time by Yugoslavia. Remarkably, in the course of the tournament the Yugoslavs defeated each of the three other semi-finalists, and eliminated the defending champions Brazil. The tournament took place in four venues:  Antofagasta, Valparaíso, Concepción and Santiago.

Qualification

1.Teams that made their debut.

Squads 

For a list of all squads that played in the final tournament, see 1987 FIFA World Youth Championship squads

Group stages
The 16 teams were split into four groups of four teams.  Four group winners, and four second-place finishers qualify for the knockout round.

Group A

Group B

Group C

Group D

Knockout stages

Quarter-finals

Semifinals

Third place play-off

Final

Result

Awards

Goalscorers

Marcel Witeczek of West Germany won the Golden Shoe award for scoring seven goals. In total, 86 goals were scored by 51 different players, with none of them credited as own goal.

7 goals
 Marcel Witeczek
6 goals
 Davor Šuker
5 goals
 Camilo Pino
4 goals
 Matthias Sammer
3 goals

 Luka Tudor
 Predrag Mijatović
 Zvonimir Boban

2 goals

 Alcindo Sartori
 André Cruz
 William
 John Jairo Trellez
 Miguel Guerrero
 Dariusz Wosz
 Alessandro Melli
 Joe McLeod
 Scott Nisbet
 Knut Reinhardt
 Igor Štimac

1 goal

 Alistair Edwards
 Kurt Reynolds
 Mohamed Al Kharraz
 Dimitar Trendafilov
 Ivo Slavtchev
 Radko Kalaydjiev
 Billy Domezetis
 Domenic Mobilio
 James Grimes
 Steve Jansen
 Pedro González Vera
 Jörg Prasse
 Heiko Liebers
 Rico Steinmann
 Torsten Kracht
 Antonio Rizzolo
 Marco Carrara
 Stefano Impallomeni
 David Adekola
 Okon Ene Effa
 John Butler
 Paul Wright
 Salissou Ali
 Christian Unger
 Michael Constantino
 Alexander Strehmel
 Andreas Möller
 Detlev Dammeier
 Henrik Eichenauer
 Thomas Epp
 Branko Brnović
 Ranko Zirojević
 Robert Prosinečki

Final ranking

Notes

External links
FIFA World Youth Championship Chile 1987 , FIFA.com
RSSSF > FIFA World Youth Championship > 1987
FIFA Technical Report (Part 1) and (Part 2)
Yugoslavia in the 90s: the greatest team there never was?;Jonathan Wilson's Blog @ guardian.co.uk, 24 July 2007

FIFA World Youth Championship
Fifa World Youth Championship, 1987
International association football competitions hosted by Chile
1987 in Chilean football
October 1987 sports events in South America